Alabama was admitted to the Union on December 14, 1819. The state elects U.S. senators to Class 2 and Class 3. Its United States Senate seats were declared vacant from March 1861 to July 1868 due to its secession from the Union during the American Civil War. Richard Shelby is Alabama's longest serving senator (served 1987–2023). Alabama's current U.S. senators are Republicans Tommy Tuberville (since 2021) and Katie Britt (since 2023).

List of senators

|- style="height:2em"
! rowspan=21 | 1
| rowspan=21 align=left | William R. King
| rowspan=4  | Democratic-Republican
| rowspan=21 nowrap | Dec 14, 1819 –Apr 15, 1844
| rowspan=3 | Elected in 1819.
| rowspan=3 | 1
| 
| rowspan=4 | 1
| rowspan=2 | Elected in 1819.Resigned.
| rowspan=2 nowrap | Dec 14, 1819 –Dec 12, 1822
| rowspan=2  | Democratic-Republican
| rowspan=2 align=right | John Williams Walker
! rowspan=2 | 1

|- style="height:2em"
| rowspan=2 

|- style="height:2em"
| rowspan=2 | Elected to finish Walker's term.Retired.
| rowspan=2 nowrap | Dec 12, 1822 –Mar 3, 1825
| rowspan=2  | Democratic-Republican
| align=right rowspan=2 | William Kelly
! rowspan=2 | 2

|- style="height:2em"
| rowspan=6 | Re-elected in 1822.
| rowspan=6 | 2
| 

|- style="height:2em"
| rowspan=9  | Jacksonian
| rowspan=4 
| rowspan=6 | 2
| Elected in 1824 or 1825.Died.
| nowrap | Mar 4, 1825 –Jan 24, 1826
|  | Jacksonian
| align=right | Henry H. Chambers
! 3

|- style="height:2em"
|  
| nowrap | Jan 24, 1826 –Feb 17, 1826
| colspan=3 | Vacant

|- style="height:2em"
| Appointed to continue Chambers's term.Successor elected.
| nowrap | Feb 17, 1826 –Nov 27, 1826
|  | Jacksonian
| align=right | Israel Pickens
! 4

|- style="height:2em"
| rowspan=3 | Elected to finish Chambers's term.Lost re-election.
| rowspan=3 nowrap | Nov 27, 1826 –Mar 3, 1831
| rowspan=3  | Jacksonian
| rowspan=3 align=right | John McKinley
! rowspan=3 | 5

|- style="height:2em"
| 

|- style="height:2em"
| rowspan=3 | Re-elected in 1828.
| rowspan=3 | 3
| 

|- style="height:2em"
| 
| rowspan=3 | 3
| rowspan=3 | Elected in 1831.Lost re-election.
| rowspan=3 nowrap | Mar 4, 1831 –Mar 3, 1837
|  | Jacksonian
| rowspan=3 align=right | Gabriel Moore
! rowspan=3 | 6

|- style="height:2em"
| 
| rowspan=2  | NationalRepublican

|- style="height:2em"
| rowspan=5 | Re-elected in 1834.
| rowspan=5 | 4
| 

|- style="height:2em"
| rowspan=8  | Democratic
| rowspan=3 
| rowspan=7 | 4
| Elected in 1837.Resigned to become a Justice of the U.S. Supreme Court.
| nowrap | Mar 4, 1837 –Apr 22, 1837
|  | Democratic
| align=right | John McKinley
! 7

|- style="height:2em"
|  
| nowrap | Apr 22, 1837 –Jun 19, 1837
| colspan=3 | Vacant

|- style="height:2em"
| rowspan=3 | Elected to finish McKinley's term.Resigned.
| rowspan=3 nowrap | Jun 19, 1837 –Nov 15, 1841
| rowspan=3  | Democratic
| rowspan=3 align=right | Clement Comer Clay
! rowspan=3 | 8

|- style="height:2em"
| 

|- style="height:2em"
| rowspan=4 | Re-elected in 1840.Resigned to become U.S. Minister to France.
| rowspan=7 | 5
| rowspan=3 

|- style="height:2em"
|  
| Nov 15, 1841 –Nov 24, 1841
| colspan=3 | Vacant

|- style="height:2em"
| Elected to finish Clay's term.
| rowspan=6 nowrap | Nov 24, 1841 –Jun 16, 1848
| rowspan=6  | Democratic
| rowspan=6 align=right | Arthur P. Bagby
! rowspan=6 | 9

|- style="height:2em"
| rowspan=3 
| rowspan=9 | 5
| rowspan=5 | Re-elected in 1842.Resigned to become U.S. Minister to Russia.

|- style="height:2em"
| colspan=3 | Vacant
| nowrap | Apr 15, 1844 –Apr 22, 1844
|  

|- style="height:2em"
! rowspan=5 | 2
| rowspan=5 align=left | Dixon Hall Lewis
| rowspan=5  | Democratic
| rowspan=5 nowrap | Apr 22, 1844 –Oct 24, 1848
| rowspan=2 | Appointed to finish King's term.

|- style="height:2em"
| 

|- style="height:2em"
| rowspan=3 | Elected in 1847.Died.
| rowspan=10 | 6
| rowspan=5 

|- style="height:2em"
|  
| nowrap | Jun 16, 1848 –Jul 1, 1848
| colspan=3 | Vacant

|- style="height:2em"
| rowspan=3 | Appointed to continue Bagby's term.Elected to finish Bagby's term.
| rowspan=6 nowrap | Jul 1, 1848 –Dec 20, 1852
| rowspan=6  | Democratic
| rowspan=6 align=right | William R. King
! rowspan=6 | 10

|- style="height:2em"
| colspan=3 | Vacant
| nowrap | Oct 24, 1848 –Nov 25, 1848
|  

|- style="height:2em"
! rowspan=2 | 3
| rowspan=2 align=left | Benjamin Fitzpatrick
| rowspan=2  | Democratic
| rowspan=2 nowrap | Nov 25, 1848 –Nov 30, 1849
| rowspan=2 | Appointed to continue Lewis's term.Successor elected.

|- style="height:2em"
| rowspan=2 
| rowspan=7 | 6
| rowspan=3 | Re-elected in 1848 or 1849.Resigned due to poor health.

|- style="height:2em"
! rowspan=4 | 4
| rowspan=4 align=left | Jeremiah Clemens
| rowspan=4  | Democratic
| rowspan=4 nowrap | Nov 30, 1849 –Mar 3, 1853
| rowspan=4 | Elected to finish Lewis's term.Lost re-election.

|- style="height:2em"
| rowspan=3 

|- style="height:2em"
|  
| nowrap | Dec 20, 1852 –Jan 14, 1853
| colspan=3 | Vacant

|- style="height:2em"
| rowspan=3 | Appointed to continue King's term.Elected in 1853 to finish King's term.
| rowspan=3 nowrap | Jan 14, 1853 –Mar 3, 1855
| rowspan=3  | Democratic
| rowspan=3 align=right | Benjamin Fitzpatrick
! rowspan=7 | 11

|- style="height:2em"
| colspan=3 | Vacant
| nowrap | Mar 4, 1853 –Nov 29, 1853
| Legislature failed to elect.
| rowspan=5 | 7
| rowspan=2 

|- style="height:2em"
! rowspan=5 | 5
| rowspan=5 align=left | Clement Claiborne Clay
| rowspan=5  | Democratic
| rowspan=5 nowrap | Nov 29, 1853 –Jan 21, 1861
| rowspan=4 | Elected late in 1853.

|- style="height:2em"
| rowspan=2 
| rowspan=5 | 7
| Legislature failed to elect.
| nowrap | Mar 4, 1855 –Nov 26, 1855
| colspan=2 | Vacant

|- style="height:2em"
| rowspan=3 | Elected late.Withdrew.
| rowspan=3 nowrap | Nov 26, 1855 –Jan 21, 1861
| rowspan=3  | Democratic
| rowspan=3 align=right | Benjamin Fitzpatrick

|- style="height:2em"
| 

|- style="height:2em"
| Re-elected in 1858.Withdrew.
| rowspan=4 | 8
| rowspan=2 

|- style="height:2em"
| rowspan=5 colspan=3 | Vacant
| rowspan=5 nowrap | Jan 21, 1861 –Jul 13, 1868
| rowspan=5 valign=center | Civil War and Reconstruction
| rowspan=5 valign=center | Civil War and Reconstruction
| rowspan=5 nowrap | Jan 21, 1861 –Jul 13, 1868
| rowspan=5 colspan=3 | Vacant

|- style="height:2em"
| 
| rowspan=3 | 8

|- style="height:2em"
| 

|- style="height:2em"
| rowspan=4 | 9
| 

|- style="height:2em"
| rowspan=2 
| rowspan=4 | 9

|- style="height:2em"
! rowspan=2 | 6
| rowspan=2 align=left | Willard Warner
| rowspan=2  | Republican
| rowspan=2 nowrap | Jul 13, 1868 –Mar 3, 1871
| rowspan=2 | Elected in 1868 to finish vacant term.Lost re-election.
| rowspan=3 | Elected in 1868 to finish vacant term.
| rowspan=6 nowrap | Jul 13, 1868 –Mar 3, 1879
| rowspan=6  | Republican
| rowspan=6 align=right | George E. Spencer
! rowspan=6 | 12

|- style="height:2em"
| 

|- style="height:2em"
! rowspan=3 | 7
| rowspan=3 align=left | George Goldthwaite
| rowspan=3  | Democratic
| rowspan=3 nowrap | Mar 4, 1871 –Mar 3, 1877
| rowspan=3 | Elected in 1870.Retired.
| rowspan=3 | 10
| 

|- style="height:2em"
| 
| rowspan=3 | 10
| rowspan=3 | Re-elected in 1872.Retired.

|- style="height:2em"
| 

|- style="height:2em"
! rowspan=19 | 8
| rowspan=19 align=left | John Tyler Morgan
| rowspan=19  | Democratic
| rowspan=19 nowrap | Mar 4, 1877 –Jun 11, 1907
| rowspan=6 | Elected in 1876.
| rowspan=6 | 11
| 

|- style="height:2em"
| rowspan=4 
| rowspan=6 | 11
| Elected in 1878.Died.
| nowrap | Mar 4, 1879 –Dec 31, 1879
|  | Democratic
| align=right | George S. Houston
! 13

|- style="height:2em"
|  
| nowrap | Dec 31, 1879 –Jan 7, 1880
| colspan=3 | Vacant

|- style="height:2em"
| Appointed to continue Houston's term.Successor qualified.
| nowrap | Jan 7, 1880 –Nov 23, 1880
|  | Democratic
| align=right | Luke Pryor
! 14

|- style="height:2em"
| rowspan=3 | Elected to finish Houston's term.
| rowspan=9 nowrap | Nov 24, 1880 –Mar 3, 1897
| rowspan=9  | Democratic
| rowspan=9 align=right | James L. Pugh
! rowspan=9 | 15

|- style="height:2em"
| 

|- style="height:2em"
| rowspan=3 | Re-elected in 1882.
| rowspan=3 | 12
| 

|- style="height:2em"
| 
| rowspan=3 | 12
| rowspan=3 | Re-elected in 1884.

|- style="height:2em"
| 

|- style="height:2em"
| rowspan=3 | Re-elected in 1888.
| rowspan=3 | 13
| 

|- style="height:2em"
| 
| rowspan=3 | 13
| rowspan=3 | Re-elected in 1890.Lost renomination.

|- style="height:2em"
| 

|- style="height:2em"
| rowspan=3 | Re-elected in 1894.
| rowspan=3 | 14
| 

|- style="height:2em"
| 
| rowspan=3 | 14
| rowspan=3 | Elected in 1897.

| rowspan=8 nowrap | Mar 4, 1897 –Jul 27, 1907
| rowspan=8  | Democratic
| rowspan=8 align=right | Edmund Pettus
! rowspan=8 | 16

|- style="height:2em"
| 

|- style="height:2em"
| rowspan=3 | Re-elected in 1900.
| rowspan=3 | 15
| 

|- style="height:2em"
| 
| rowspan=7 | 15
| rowspan=5 | Re-elected in 1903.Re-elected early in 1907, but died.

|- style="height:2em"
| 

|- style="height:2em"
| Re-elected in 1907.Died.
| rowspan=7 | 16
| rowspan=5 

|- style="height:2em"
| colspan=3 | Vacant
| Jun 11, 1907 –Jun 18, 1907
|  

|- style="height:2em"
! rowspan=11 | 9
| rowspan=11 align=left | John H. Bankhead
| rowspan=11  | Democratic
| rowspan=11 nowrap | Jun 18, 1907 –Mar 1, 1920
| rowspan=5 | Appointed to continue Morgan's term.Elected in 1907 to finish Morgan's term.

|- style="height:2em"
|  
| Jul 27, 1907 –Aug 6, 1907
| colspan=3 | Vacant

|- style="height:2em"
| Elected to finish Pettus's term.
| rowspan=4 nowrap | Aug 6, 1907 –Aug 8, 1913
| rowspan=4  | Democratic
| rowspan=4 align=right | Joseph F. Johnston
! rowspan=4 | 17

|- style="height:2em"
| 
| rowspan=5 | 16
| rowspan=3 | Elected in to next term.Died.

|- style="height:2em"
| 

|- style="height:2em"
| rowspan=5 | Re-elected early January 17, 1911.
| rowspan=5 | 17
| rowspan=3 

|- style="height:2em"
| Henry De Lamar Clayton Jr. (D) was appointed in 1913 to continue the term, but his appointment was challenged and withdrawn.Franklin Potts Glass Sr. (D) was subsequently appointed to continue the term, but the Senate refused to seat him.
| Aug 8, 1913 –May 11, 1914
| colspan=3 | Vacant

|- style="height:2em"
| Elected to finish Johnston's term.Retired.
| May 11, 1914 –Mar 3, 1915
|  | Democratic
| align=right | Francis S. White
! 18

|- style="height:2em"
| 
| rowspan=6 | 17
| rowspan=6 | Elected in 1914.
| rowspan=9 nowrap | Mar 4, 1915 –Mar 3, 1927
| rowspan=9  | Democratic
| rowspan=9 align=right | Oscar Underwood
! rowspan=9 | 19

|- style="height:2em"
| 

|- style="height:2em"
| Re-elected in 1918.Died.
| rowspan=6 | 18
| rowspan=4 

|- style="height:2em"
| colspan=3 | Vacant
| Mar 1, 1920 –Mar 5, 1920
|  

|- style="height:2em"
! 10
| align=left | B. B. Comer
|  | Democratic
| Mar 5, 1920 –Nov 2, 1920
| Appointed to continue Bankhead's term.Successor elected.

|- style="height:2em"
! rowspan=6 | 11
| rowspan=6 align=left | James Thomas Heflin
| rowspan=6  | Democratic
| rowspan=6 nowrap | Nov 3, 1920 –Mar 3, 1931
| rowspan=3 | Elected to finish Bankhead's term.

|- style="height:2em"
| 
| rowspan=3 | 18
| rowspan=3 | Re-elected in 1920.Retired.

|- style="height:2em"
| 

|- style="height:2em"
| rowspan=3 |Re-elected in 1924.Disqualified.
| rowspan=3 | 19
| 

|- style="height:2em"
| 
| rowspan=3 | 19
| rowspan=3 | Elected in 1926.
| rowspan=6 nowrap | Mar 4, 1927 –Aug 19, 1937
| rowspan=6  | Democratic
| rowspan=6 align=right | Hugo Black
! rowspan=6 | 20

|- style="height:2em"
| 

|- style="height:2em"
! rowspan=10 | 12
| rowspan=10 align=left | John H. Bankhead II
| rowspan=10  | Democratic
| rowspan=10 nowrap | Mar 4, 1931 –Jun 12, 1946
| rowspan=3 | Elected in 1930.
| rowspan=3 | 20
| 

|- style="height:2em"
| 
| rowspan=5 | 20
| rowspan=3 | Re-elected in 1932.Resigned to become a Justice of the U.S. Supreme Court.

|- style="height:2em"
| 

|- style="height:2em"
| rowspan=5 | Re-elected in 1936.
| rowspan=5 | 21
| rowspan=3 

|- style="height:2em"
| Appointed by her husband to finish Black's term.Resigned when her successor won the Democratic primary.
| Aug 20, 1937 –Jan 10, 1938
|  | Democratic
| align=right | Dixie Bibb Graves
! 21

|- style="height:2em"
| Appointed to continue Graves's term.Elected in 1938 to finish Black's term.
| rowspan=20 nowrap | Jan 11, 1938 –Jan 3, 1969
| rowspan=20  | Democratic
| rowspan=20 align=right | J. Lister Hill
! rowspan=20 | 22

|- style="height:2em"
| 
| rowspan=7 | 21
| rowspan=7 | Re-elected in 1938.

|- style="height:2em"
| 

|- style="height:2em"
| rowspan=2 | Re-elected in 1942.Died.
| rowspan=7 | 22
| 

|- style="height:2em"
| rowspan=5 

|- style="height:2em"
| colspan=3 | Vacant
| Jun 12, 1946 –Jun 15, 1946
|  

|- style="height:2em"
! 13
| align=left | George R. Swift
|  | Democratic
| Jun 15, 1946 –Nov 5, 1946
| Appointed to continue Bankhead's term.Successor elected.

|- style="height:2em"
! rowspan=20 | 14
| rowspan=20 align=left | John Sparkman
| rowspan=20  | Democratic
| rowspan=20 nowrap | Nov 6, 1946 –Jan 3, 1979
| rowspan=3 | Elected to finish Bankhead's term.

|- style="height:2em"
| rowspan=3 | 22
| rowspan=3 | Re-elected in 1944.

|- style="height:2em"
| 

|- style="height:2em"
| rowspan=3 | Re-elected in 1948.
| rowspan=3 | 23
| 

|- style="height:2em"
| 
| rowspan=3 | 23
| rowspan=3 | Re-elected in 1950.

|- style="height:2em"
| 

|- style="height:2em"
| rowspan=3 | Re-elected in 1954.
| rowspan=3 | 24
| 

|- style="height:2em"
| 
| rowspan=3 | 24
| rowspan=3 | Re-elected in 1956.

|- style="height:2em"
| 

|- style="height:2em"
| rowspan=3 | Re-elected in 1960.
| rowspan=3 | 25
| 

|- style="height:2em"
| 
| rowspan=3 | 25
| rowspan=3 | Re-elected in 1962.Retired.

|- style="height:2em"
| 

|- style="height:2em"
| rowspan=3 | Re-elected in 1966.
| rowspan=3 | 26
| 

|- style="height:2em"
| 
| rowspan=3 | 26
| rowspan=3 | Elected in 1968.
| rowspan=5 nowrap | Jan 3, 1969 –Jun 1, 1978
| rowspan=5  | Democratic
| rowspan=5 align=right | James Allen
! rowspan=5 | 23

|- style="height:2em"
| 

|- style="height:2em"
| rowspan=5 | Re-elected in 1972.Retired.
| rowspan=5 | 27
| 

|- style="height:2em"
| 
| rowspan=6 | 27
| rowspan=2 | Re-elected in 1974.Died.

|- style="height:2em"
| rowspan=3 

|- style="height:2em"
| Appointed to continue her husband's term.Lost nomination to finish her husband's term.
| Jun 8, 1978 –Nov 7, 1978
|  | Democratic
| align=right | Maryon Pittman Allen
! 24

|- style="height:2em"
| rowspan=2 | Elected to finish James Allen's term.Lost renomination; resigned one day early to give his successor advantageous seniority.
| rowspan=2 nowrap | Nov 7, 1978 –Jan 2, 1981
| rowspan=2  | Democratic
| rowspan=2 align=right | Donald Stewart
! rowspan=2 | 25

|- style="height:2em"
! rowspan=11 | 15
| rowspan=11 align=left | Howell Heflin
| rowspan=11  | Democratic
| rowspan=11 nowrap | Jan 3, 1979 –Jan 3, 1997
| rowspan=4 | Elected in 1978.
| rowspan=4 | 28
| rowspan=2 

|- style="height:2em"
| Appointed to finish Stewart's term, having already been elected to the next term.
| rowspan=4 nowrap | Jan 2, 1981 –Jan 3, 1987
| rowspan=4  | Republican
| rowspan=4 align=right | Jeremiah Denton
! rowspan=4 | 26

|- style="height:2em"
| 
| rowspan=3 | 28
| rowspan=3 | Elected in 1980.Lost re-election.

|- style="height:2em"
| 

|- style="height:2em"
| rowspan=3 | Re-elected in 1984.
| rowspan=3 | 29
| 

|- style="height:2em"
| 
| rowspan=3 | 29
| rowspan=3 | Elected in 1986.
| rowspan=21 | Jan 3, 1987 –Jan 3, 2023
| rowspan=4  | Democratic
| rowspan=21 align=right | Richard Shelby
! rowspan=21 | 27

|- style="height:2em"
| 

|- style="height:2em"
| rowspan=4 | Re-elected in 1990.Retired.
| rowspan=4 | 30
| 

|- style="height:2em"
| rowspan=2 
| rowspan=4 | 30
| rowspan=4 | Re-elected in 1992.Changed parties in 1994.

|- style="height:2em"
| rowspan=17  | Republican

|- style="height:2em"
| 

|- style="height:2em"
! rowspan=11 | 16
| rowspan=11 align=left | Jeff Sessions
| rowspan=11  | Republican
| rowspan=11 nowrap | Jan 3, 1997 –Feb 8, 2017
| rowspan=3 | Elected in 1996.
| rowspan=3 | 31
| 

|- style="height:2em"
| 
| rowspan=3 | 31
| rowspan=3 | Re-elected in 1998.

|- style="height:2em"
| 

|- style="height:2em"
| rowspan=3 | Re-elected in 2002.
| rowspan=3 | 32
| 

|- style="height:2em"
| 
| rowspan=3 | 32
| rowspan=3 | Re-elected in 2004.

|- style="height:2em"
| 

|- style="height:2em"
| rowspan=3 | Re-elected in 2008.
| rowspan=3 | 33
| 

|- style="height:2em"
| 
| rowspan=3 | 33
| rowspan=3 | Re-elected in 2010.

|- style="height:2em"
| 

|- style="height:2em"
| rowspan=2 | Re-elected in 2014.Resigned to become U.S. Attorney General.
| rowspan=5 | 34
| 

|- style="height:2em"
| rowspan=3 
| rowspan=5 | 34
| rowspan=5 | Re-elected in 2016.Retired.

|- style="height:2em"
! 17
| align=left | Luther Strange
|  | Republican
| nowrap | Feb 9, 2017 –Jan 3, 2018
| Appointed to continue Sessions's term.Lost nomination to finish Sessions's term.

|- style="height:2em"
! rowspan=2 | 18
| rowspan=2 align=left |  Doug Jones
| rowspan=2  | Democratic
| rowspan=2 nowrap | Jan 3, 2018 –Jan 3, 2021
| rowspan=2 | Elected in 2017 to finish Sessions's term.Lost re-election.

|- style="height:2em"
| 

|- style="height:2em"
! rowspan=3 | 19
| rowspan=3 align=left |  Tommy Tuberville
| rowspan=3  | Republican
| rowspan=3 nowrap | Jan 3, 2021 –Present
| rowspan=3 | Elected in 2020.
| rowspan=3 | 35
| 

|- style="height:2em"
| 
| rowspan=3| 35
| rowspan=3 | Elected in 2022.
| rowspan=3| Jan 3, 2023 – Present
| rowspan=3  | Republican
| rowspan=3 align=right |  Katie Britt
! rowspan=3| 28

|- style="height:2em"
| 

|- style="height:2em"
| rowspan=2 colspan=5 | To be determined in the 2026 election.
| rowspan=2| 36
| 

|- style="height:2em"
| 
| 36
| colspan=5 | To be determined in the 2028 election.

See also

List of United States representatives from Alabama
United States congressional delegations from Alabama
Elections in Alabama
List of United States Senate elections in Alabama

Notes

References

External links 
 

 
senators
Alabama